William Kirk Kaynor (November 29, 1884 – December 20, 1929) was a United States Representative from Massachusetts.

Born in Sanborn, Iowa, Kaynor attended the common schools of Spencer and Clear Lake. In his early youth, he was employed as a drug store clerk in Clear Lake. He later moved to Gann Valley, South Dakota and herded cattle. He was graduated from Hotchkiss School, Lakeville, Connecticut in 1908, and from Yale University in 1912. He moved to Springfield, Massachusetts and engaged in the real estate and insurance business. During the First World War, he attended the officers' training school at Camp Lee, Virginia, from July to November 1918. He was a member of the common council of Springfield from 1920 to 1924, and was the postmaster of Springfield from 1923 to 1928.

He was elected as a Republican to the Seventy-first Congress and served from March 4, 1929, until his death in a United States Army Air Corps airplane accident at Bolling Field in Washington, D.C., on December 20, 1929. It was his first time in an airplane. Interment was in Oak Grove Cemetery, Springfield, Massachusetts.

See also
List of United States Congress members who died in office (1900–49)

References

External links

1884 births
1929 deaths
Massachusetts city council members
Victims of aviation accidents or incidents in the United States
Yale University alumni
American businesspeople in insurance
American real estate businesspeople
Businesspeople from Massachusetts
Hotchkiss School alumni
Accidental deaths in Washington, D.C.
Republican Party members of the United States House of Representatives from Massachusetts
People from Sanborn, Iowa
People from Spencer, Iowa
People from Clear Lake, Iowa
People from Buffalo County, South Dakota
People from Lakeville, Connecticut
Politicians from Springfield, Massachusetts
20th-century American politicians
20th-century American businesspeople
Massachusetts postmasters
Victims of aviation accidents or incidents in 1929